Repeated Absences  (French: Absences répétées) is a 1972 French drama film directed by Guy Gilles.

Cast
Patrick Penn	 ... 	François Naulet
Danièle Delorme	... 	La mère de François
Nathalie Delon	... 	Sophie
Yves Robert	... 	Le père de François
Patrick Jouané	... 	Guy (as Patrick Jouanné)
Thomas Andhersen	... 	Pierrot
Pierre Bertin	... 	Le monsieur de la soirée
Gabriel Cattand	... 	Le flic
Jacques Castelot	... 	Le directeur de la banque
Claude Génia	... 	Jeanne Larivière
Corinne Le Poulain	... 	La femme de Guy

External links
 

1972 films
French drama films
1970s French-language films
1972 drama films
Films directed by Guy Gilles
1970s French films